Grue is a municipality in Innlandet county, Norway. It is located in the traditional district of Solør. The administrative centre of the municipality is the village of Kirkenær. Other villages in the municipality include Bergesida, Grinder, Namnå, Risberget, Rotberget, Skasenden, and Svullrya.

The  municipality is the 136th largest by area out of the 356 municipalities in Norway. Grue is the 189th most populous municipality in Norway with a population of 4,548.

General information
The parish of Grue was established as a municipality on 1 January 1838 (see formannskapsdistrikt law). In 1867, the southern district of Grue (population: 3,946) was separated to become the new municipality of Brandval. This left Grue municipality with 6,464 residents. In 1941, a small area of Grue (population: 68) was transferred to the neighboring municipality of Brandval. During the 1960s, there were many municipal mergers across Norway due to the work of the Schei Committee. On 1 January 1969, the Rotberget farm area (population: 23) was transferred from Åsnes Municipality to Grue. On 1 January 1974, an unpopulated part of the Lystad area was transferred from Grue to the neighboring municipality of Kongsvinger.

Name
The municipality (originally the parish) is named after the old  farm ( or ), since the first Grue Church was built there. The name is identical with the word  which means "depression" or "hollow".

Coat of arms
The coat of arms was granted on 30 October 1992. The arms were designed by Harald Hallstensen. The arms are described as "left tilted dividing by silver and green, the dividing line is a curved wolf tooth pattern. The flame-like line represents the clearance of farms in the woods by the use of fire and is also a remembrance of the gruesome church fire of 1822. The colors symbolize the forests and the Glomma river.

Churches
The Church of Norway has two parishes within the municipality of Grue. It is part of the Solør, Vinger og Odal prosti (deanery) in the Diocese of Hamar.

Geography

Grue is situated around the Glomma river and the geography is dominated largely by forests and some agricultural areas around Glomma. Grue is located in the southeast part of Innlandet county. It is bordered on the south by the municipality of Kongsvinger, on the north by the municipality of Åsnes, and on the west by Nord-Odal. To the east, it borders Sweden.

Their first population center in Norway was located around the lake of Røgden.

The rivers Løvhaugsåa and Rotna both run through the area. The lakes Hukusjøen, Skasen, Gardsjøen.

Government
All municipalities in Norway, including Grue, are responsible for primary education (through 10th grade), outpatient health services, senior citizen services, unemployment and other social services, zoning, economic development, and municipal roads. The municipality is governed by a municipal council of elected representatives, which in turn elects a mayor.  The municipality falls under the Romerike og Glåmdal District Court and the Eidsivating Court of Appeal.

Municipal council
The municipal council  of Grue is made up of 19 representatives that are elected to four year terms. The party breakdown of the council is as follows:

Mayors
The mayors of Grue since 1838 when the municipality was established:

1838-1845: Ole Arntzen Lutzow
1846-1847: Jørgen Cappelen Omsted 
1848-1857: Nicolai Astrup  
1858-1859: Gunder Gundersen
1860-1863: Jacob Rolsdorph Andersen
1864-1879: Ole Bredesen Opset
1880-1883: Arne A. Omsted
1883-1887: Ole Bredesen Opset
1888-1898: Arne A. Omsted
1899-1907: Amund Bredesen Opset
1908-1913: Wilhelm Omsted
1914-1919: Amund Bredesen Opset
1920-1925: Magnus Vangerud
1926-1928: Sigurd Woll
1929-1931: Ole H. Sæther  
1932-1933: Arve Myrvang 
1933-1934: Arne Tveter
1935-1935: Ole Kamphaug
1936-1940: Eivind Grimstad
1940-1945: Vacant due to WWII
1945-1945: Martin Møllerud
1946-1955: Magnus Vangerud
1956-1963: Reidar Mellem
1964-1964: Martin Råberget
1964-1978: Thor Henriksen
1979-1985: Torbjøn Øveråsen
1985-1999: Ragnar Nyman
1999-2007: Niels Ferdinand Rolsdorph
2007-2011: Herdis Bragelien
2011-2015: Niels Ferdinand Rolsdorph
2015-2019: Wenche Huser Sund
2019–present: Rune Grenberg

Notable people 

Andreas Aagaard Kiønig (1771–1856), lawyer, representative at the Norwegian Constitutional Assembly
Andreas Arntzen (1777–1837), politician, police chief, Supreme Court judge & timber merchant
Mor Sæther (1793–1851), Norwegian "klok kone" ("cunning woman"), i.e. a herbalist
Ole Peter Riis Høegh (1806–1852), trained civilian architect, Bergen's first town surveyor
Wilhelm Maribo Schøyen (1844–1918), Norway's first government entomologist
Olav Strøm (1866-1963), pioneer trade unionist 
Kristian Prestrud (1881–1927), naval officer, member of Amundsen's South Pole expedition
Hagbart Haakonsen (1895-1984), cross-country skier, competed at the 1928 Winter Olympics
Åsta Holth (1904–1999), novelist, poet and short story writer
Kåre Jonsborg (1912–1977), painter and textile artist
Sinikka Langeland (born 1961), traditional folk singer and kantele player
Tom Harald Hagen (born 1978), football UEFA referee

Gallery

References

External links

Municipal fact sheet from Statistics Norway 

 
Municipalities of Innlandet
Forest Finns
Populated places on the Glomma River
1838 establishments in Norway